Richard Chambers (born 1989) is an Irish journalist and author who is currently the TV news correspondent for Virgin Media.

Early life 
Chambers was born in Belfast. He grew up in Lahinch before moving to Rush.

Chambers studied law in University College, Dublin (UCD), before receiving a master's degree in journalism from Dublin City University (DCU).

Career 
Chambers started his career with an internship at Today FM. After working for the Irish Daily Star for a short spell, Chambers returned to Today FM, before joining Newstalk. Chambers was a news reporter for Newstalk from 2013 before joining Virgin Media in August 2018. In 2021, he was promoted to news correspondent. Chambers was ranked the 8th most influential journalist in Ireland by PR consultants Murray in 2021.

Chambers was involved in the coverage of the COVID-19 pandemic, reporting on the daily case figures, vaccination uptake and announcements of government restrictions on his Twitter account. He wrote A State Of Emergency: The Story of Ireland's Covid Crisis, a book about the pandemic and Ireland's response in 2021. His book was nominated for the 2021 Irish Book Awards, and was described by RTÉ's Sinéad Crowley as one of her "books of the year". Health minister Stephen Donnelly was interviewed about the book on Prime Time in November 2021, with Donnelly saying he "wouldn't be reading" the book and that it didn't "marry" Donnelly "with [his] experience".

Personal life 
Chambers's girlfriend is author Louise O'Neill, who he met in 2018. He lives in a house-share in Castleknock.

Chambers was involved in an online feud with Westlife's Brian McFadden, with McFadden describing him as a "knobhead".

He is a supporter of Bohemian F.C.

References 

Alumni of University College Dublin
Alumni of Dublin City University
Living people
1989 births